Via Asinaria was an ancient Roman road that started from Porta Asinaria in the Aurelian walls (Rome).
It was somehow connected with the Via Latina, as it is reported that Belisarius, during its advance on Rome, left the Via Latina to enter the city from Porta Asinaria; the latter was considered one of the main accesses for those coming from the south, as in ancient times the 17th-century Porta San Giovanni didn't exist.

Via Asinaria is mentioned by Rufus Festus, who, in one passage, places it between Via Ardeatina and Via Latina. The historian therefore suggests that its route, starting from Porta Asinaria to the east of Via Latina, had to cross the latter, since Via Ardeatina is west of Via Latina, on the other side of the urban gate.
The actual route is still debated among historians, but probably the initial stretch on the outskirts of Rome coincides with that of the present Via Appia Nuova.

Antonio Nibby (op. cit. P. 587) believes that it started from Porta Caelimontana in the Servian Wall.

Giuseppe Lugli reaffirmed its route through Porta Caelimontana and Porta Asinaria and considered it a service road, intended to transversely connect the groups of villae "between Via Ardeatina, Via Appia, Via Castrimeniese and perhaps also Via Latina, until it reconnected with the latter in the estate called Roma Vecchia".

Notes

Bibliography
Via Asinaria in Platner & Ashby, A Topographical Dictionary of Ancient Rome.
Antonio Nibby, Analisi storico-topografico-antiquaria della carta de'dintorni di Roma tomo III, Rome 1837

External links 
 

Roman roads in Italy
Ancient Roman roads in Rome